Anisoscelis podalicus is a species of leaf-footed bug in the family Coreidae. It was first described by Brailovsky and Mayorga in 1995. it has been recorded in Costa Rica.

References 

Anisoscelidini